Agri Bujaq (also Romanized as Agrī Būjāq; also known as Ara Būjāq, Ari Boochagh, Ayrībūjāq, Ayrī Būjāq, Bujakh, Īrībūjāq, and Yarī Būjāq) is a village in Dizaj Rural District, in the Central District of Khoy County, West Azerbaijan Province, Iran. At the 2006 census, its population was 945, in 191 families.

References 

Populated places in Khoy County